Māris Lēģeris (born 29 July 1977) is a Latvian luger. He competed in the men's doubles event at the 1998 Winter Olympics.

References

External links
 

1977 births
Living people
Latvian male lugers
Olympic lugers of Latvia
Lugers at the 1998 Winter Olympics
People from Cēsis